The Illustrated Chronicle of Ivan the Terrible  is the largest compilation of historical information ever assembled in medieval Russia. It covers the period from the creation of the world to the year 1567. It is also informally known as the Tsar Book (Царь-книга), in an analogy with Tsar Bell and Tsar Cannon.

The set of manuscripts was commissioned by Ivan the Terrible specifically for his royal library. The literal meaning of the Russian title is "face chronicle," alluding to the numerous hand-painted miniatures. The compilation consists of 10 volumes, containing about 10 thousand sheets of rag paper. It is illustrated with more than 16 thousand miniatures.

Volumes 

The volumes are grouped in a relatively chronological order and include four major areas: Biblical History, History of Rome, History of Byzantium and Russian history. The titles and contents of the 10 volumes are:

 Museum Miscellany (Музейский сборник, State Historical Museum) – 1,031 pages, 1,677 miniatures. Sacred Hebrew and Greek history, from the creation of the world to the destruction of Troy in the 13th century BC.
 Chronograph Miscellany (Хронографический сборник, Library of the Russian Academy of Sciences) – 1,469 pages, 2,549 miniatures. History of the ancient East, the Hellenistic world, and ancient Rome from the 11th century BC to the 70s in the 1st century AD.
 Face Chronograph (Лицевой хронограф, Russian National Library) – 1,217 pages, 2,191 miniature. History of the ancient Roman Empire from the 70s in the 1st century to 337 AD, and Byzantine history to the 10th century.
 Galitzine Volume (Голицынский том, RNL) – 1,035 pages, 1,964 miniatures. Russian history from 1114–1247 and 1425-1472.
 Laptev Volume (Лаптевский том, RNL) – 1,005 pages, 1,951 miniatures. Russian history from 1116-1252.
 Osterman Volume I (Остермановский первый том, LRAS) – 802 pages, 1,552 miniatures. Russian history from 1254-1378.
 Osterman Volume II (Остермановский второй том, LRAS) – 887 pages, 1,581 miniature. Russian history from 1378-1424.
 Shumilov Volume (Шумиловский том, RNL) – 986 pages, 1,893 miniatures. Russian history in 1425, and 1478-1533.
 Synod Volume (Синодальный том, SHM) – 626 pages, 1,125 miniatures. Russian history from 1533–1542, and 1553-1567.
 Regal Book (Царственная книга, SHM) – 687 pages, 1,291 miniature. Russian history from 1533-1553.

History 

The manuscript is thought to have been created between 1568 and 1576. The work seems to have been started as early as the 1540s.  It was commissioned by Ivan the Terrible for the royal library for the purposes of educating his children. The tsar's confidant Aleksey Adashev was involved in the creation of the work.

References

External links 

 The Chronicles of Ivan the Terrible
 Gift to Glasgow University marks 100 years of special relationship with Russia
 Personal Chronicle of Ivan the Terrible
 Russian Embassy presents the Illustrated Chronicles of Ivan the Terrible
 Illustrated Chronicle Of Ivan The Terrible Pictures and Images

 
East Slavic chronicles
Ivan the Terrible
Medieval Russia
Illuminated histories